Christy Walsh was a hurler who played with Kerry and Kilmoyley, he also played football with Ardfert and the Kerry Junior team.

Sources

 http://www.sportsfile.com/id/004513/ 
 http://www.sportsfile.com/id/004512/ 
 http://hoganstand.com/Kerry/ArticleForm.aspx?ID=13899
 http://hoganstand.com/Kerry/ArticleForm.aspx?ID=37449
 https://web.archive.org/web/20110713150516/http://www.kilmoyleygaa.com/profiles/senior_player_profiles.htm

Year of birth missing (living people)
Living people
Ardfert Gaelic footballers
Dicksboro hurlers
Dicksboro footballers
Dual players
Kerry inter-county Gaelic footballers
Kerry inter-county hurlers
Kilmoyley hurlers
Munster inter-provincial hurlers
UCC hurlers